Hajjiabad (also Romanized as Ḩājjīābād) is a village in Harabarjan Rural District, Marvast District, Khatam County, Yazd Province, Iran. At the 2006 census, its population was 16, in 6 families.

References 

Populated places in Khatam County